Émile Robert Wegelin (24 December 1875 in Lyon – 26 June 1962 in Lyon) was a French rower who competed in the 1900 Summer Olympics. He was part of the French boat Club Nautique de Lyon, which won the silver medal in the coxed fours.

References

External links

 

1875 births
1962 deaths
French male rowers
Olympic rowers of France
Rowers at the 1900 Summer Olympics
Olympic silver medalists for France
Olympic medalists in rowing
Medalists at the 1900 Summer Olympics